The Designers Choice is an American sailing dinghy that was designed by Sparkman & Stephens as a sail training and racing boat and first built in 1978. It was Sparkman & Stephens' design #2349.

The Designers Choice was later developed into the Shadow, by making the cockpit longer and deeper and adding internal seating.

Production
The design was built by Howmar Boats in the United States starting in 1978. A total of 1,500 boats were produced, but the company went out of business in 1983 and the boat went out of production at that time.

Design
The Designers Choice is a recreational sailboat, built predominantly of fiberglass. The hull design is flat aft, so the boat will plane. It has a fractional sloop rig with anodized aluminum spars and a loose-footed mainsail. The hull has a slightly raked stem, a vertical transom, a transom-hung, kick-up rudder controlled by a tiller and a retractable centerboard. The forward part of the boat is open, without a foredeck. The aft deck includes a small stowage locker. The cockpit is self-draining. The boat displaces .

For sailing the design is equipped with an outhaul, boom vang, a Cunningham and a jib window. It is also fitted with foam flotation for buoyancy, hiking straps and may also be optionally equipped with a spinnaker for sailing downwind.

The boat may be fitted with a small outboard motor for docking and maneuvering.

Operational history
In a 1994 review Richard Sherwood wrote, "this is a combination boat, meant for training, racing, or general sailing. The Designers Choice has curved sections forward and is relatively dry. With flat surfaces aft, she planes."

See also
List of sailing boat types

References

External links
Video: Sailing a Designers Choice

Dinghies
1970s sailboat type designs
Sailboat type designs by Sparkman and Stephens
Sailboat types built by Howmar Boats